Angus Gillams (born 3 August 1995 in Doncaster) is an English professional squash  player. As of February 2018, he was ranked number 71 squash rankings in the world.

References

1995 births
Living people
English male squash players